Templo Expiatorio Nacional de San Felipe de Jesús is an historic church in Mexico City, Mexico.

References

External links
 

Historic center of Mexico City
Roman Catholic churches in Mexico City